The 1914 Tullamore by-election was held on 8 December 1914.  The by-election was held due to the death of the incumbent Irish Parliamentary MP, Edmund Haviland-Burke.  It was won by the Independent Nationalist candidate Edward John Graham.

Votes

References
 Parliamentary Election Results in Ireland, 1801–1922, edited by B.M. Walker (Royal Irish Academy 1978)

1914 elections in Ireland
1914 elections in the United Kingdom
By-elections to the Parliament of the United Kingdom in King's County constituencies